Skrīveri Parish is an administrative unit of Aizkraukle Municipality in the Vidzeme region of Latvia.

Towns, villages and settlements of Skrīveri Parish 
Klidziņa 
Līči 
Skrīveri – parish administrative center
Ziedugravas

Notable people 
 Andrejs Upīts
 Jorģis Zemitāns

Parishes of Latvia
Aizkraukle Municipality
Vidzeme